Karl-Heinz Weber (30 January 1922 – 7 June 1944) was a Luftwaffe flying ace of World War II. He was also a recipient of the Knight's Cross of the Iron Cross with Oak Leaves, the highest award in the military and paramilitary forces of Nazi Germany during World War II. Weber was credited with 136 aerial victories—that is, 136 aerial combat encounters resulting in the destruction of the enemy aircraft. All his victories were claimed over the Eastern Front in over 500 combat missions.

Career
Weber, the son of a Reichsbahn-Sekretär, was born on 30 January 1922 in Heringsdorf in the province of Pomerania, a Free State of Prussia. A pre-war glider pilot, he volunteered for military service in the Luftwaffe in late 1939. Leutnant Weber was posted to 7. Staffel (7th squadron) of Jagdgeschwader 51 (JG 51—51st Fighter Wing) on 1 October 1940.

On the Eastern Front
In June 1941, JG 51 and the majority of the Luftwaffe were transferred to the Eastern Front in preparation for Operation Barbarossa, the invasion of the Soviet Union. There, Weber claimed his first aerial victory on 24 June 1941 over a Tupolev SB-2 bomber. On 6 July, for his achievements to date he was awarded the Iron Cross 2nd Class.

During the Battle of Rzhev on 3 September 1942, Weber claimed a Petlyakov Pe-2 twin-engined dive bomber shot down in combat southwest of Sychyovka.  Later that day, the airfield at Dugino came under Soviet bomber attack, during its defense, he was shot down and wounded in his Messerschmitt Bf 109 F-2 (Werknummer 8240—factory number) northwest of Dugino. While Weber was recovering from his injuries, III. Gruppe (3rd group) was relocated to Jesau, near Königsberg in East Prussia for conversion to the Focke Wulf Fw 190 A-2 and A-3. On 19 November 1942, Soviet forces launched the Velikiye Luki offensive operation. During this operation, Weber claimed a Mikoyan-Gurevich MiG-3 fighter east-southeast of Zubtsov on 15 January 1943. Operating from the airfield at Oryol-West, equipped with heated hangars and buildings, III. Gruppe was tasked with operating in the airspace south and east of Oryol. On 23 February, in the area north of Oryol and east of Zhizdra, Weber claimed a Lavochkin-Gorbunov-Gudkov LaGG-3 fighter and an Ilyushin Il-2 ground-attack aircraft shot down. The following day, in combat northeast of Zhizdra, Weber claimed two Petlyakov Pe-2 bombers shot down. On 16 March, he was awarded the German Cross in Gold.

Squadron leader
On 5 June 1943, Weber temporarily was given command of 7. Staffel, replacing Hauptmann Herbert Wehnelt who had fallen ill. On 5 July, III. Gruppe began flying missions in support of Operation Citadel, as part of the Battle of Kursk. The Gruppe supported the 9th Army, attacking the salient from the north. That day, Weber became an "ace-in-a-day" for the first time. On an early morning mission east of Maloarkhangelsk he claimed a MiG-3 fighter shot down. In the early afternoon, on mission to the combat area near Ponyri, his flight intercepted a formation of Douglas A-20 Havoc, also known as Boston, escorted by Lavochkin La-5 fighters. In this encounter, Weber claimed a Boston and a La-5 shot down. On an early evening mission to Maloarkhangelsk, the Gruppe encountered Il-2 ground-attack aircraft escorted by fighter aircraft. In this engagement, Weber claimed a Yakovlev Yak-1 fighter and a La-5 fighter shot down. On 12 July, Weber and his wingman Unteroffizier Heinrich Dittlmann shot down Mladshiy Leytenant Nikolay Zhukov and Leytenant Nikolay Safonov from 32 GvIAP (Guards Fighter Aviation Regiment—Gvardeyskiy Istrebitelny Aviatsionny Polk).

On 13 August, Weber was then officially appointed Staffelkapitän (squadron leader) of the Staffel. The day before, he had been credited with his 100th aerial victory. He was the 49th Luftwaffe pilot to achieve the century mark.

On 1 April 1944, 7. Staffel relocated to an airfield at Terespol. On the first mission from this airfield, the Staffel escorted Heinkel He 111 bombers on a mission to Kovel. Northwest of Kovel, the Staffel intercepted 15 Il-2 ground-attack aircraft. In the aerial encounter, 7. Staffel pilots without loss of their own claimed eight Il-2s shot down, including two by Weber. In April 1944, III. Gruppe began re-equipping with the Bf 109 G-6 with 7. Staffel making the transition in early May at an airfield at Dęblin–Irena. On 28 May, III. Gruppe of JG 51 received orders to transfer one Staffel to the west in Defence of the Reich. The Gruppenkommandeur (group commander) Hauptmann Diethelm von Eichel-Streiber selected Weber's 7. Staffel which was then subordinated to the II. Gruppe of Jagdgeschwader 1 (JG 1—1st Fighter Wing).

Group commander and missing in action

Following the transfer west, Weber was appointed Gruppenkommandeur of III. Gruppe of JG 1 on 3 June, succeeding Major Hartmann Grasser in this capacity. Only four days later, on 7 June, Weber led III. Gruppe of JG 1 from Beauvais–Tillé against Allied fighters south of Rouen on his first mission over the Invasion Front. He was reported as missing in action. It is assumed that he was shot down and killed in his Bf 109 G-6/AS (Werknummer 410 399) by P-51 Mustang fighters from No. 315 Polish Fighter Squadron. 

Following Weber's death, command of III. Gruppe was temporarily given to Haupmann Alfred Grislawski who had led 8. Staffel of JG 1. Weber's body was never recovered. He was posthumously awarded the Knight's Cross of the Iron Cross with Oak Leaves. He was the 529th member of the German armed forces to be so honored. On 14 November 1952, Weber was declared dead as of 31 December 1945 by the Amtsgericht, an official court, in Stade.

Summary of career

Aerial victory claims
According to US historian David T. Zabecki, Weber was credited with 136 aerial victories. Prien, Rodeike, Obermaier and Spick also list Weber with 136 aerial victories claimed in over 500 combat missions. Mathews and Foreman, authors of Luftwaffe Aces — Biographies and Victory Claims, researched the German Federal Archives and found records for 132 aerial victory claims, plus one further unconfirmed claim. All of his aerial victories were claimed on the Eastern Front.

Victory claims were logged to a map-reference (PQ = Planquadrat), for example "PQ 57744". These sectors were then subdivided into 36 smaller units to give a location area 3 × 4 km in size.

Awards
 Iron Cross (1939)
 2nd Class (6 July 1941)
 1st Class (17 August 1941)
 Honour Goblet of the Luftwaffe on 21 September 1942 as Leutnant and pilot
 German Cross in Gold on 16 March 1943 as Leutnant in the 7./Jagdgeschwader 51
 Knight's Cross of the Iron Cross with Oak Leaves
 Knight's Cross on 12 November 1943 as Oberleutnant and Staffelführer of the 7./Jagdgeschwader 51 "Mölders"
 529th Oak Leaves on 20 July 1944 on (posthumously) and Hauptmann and Staffelkapitän of the 7./Jagdgeschwader 51 "Mölders"

Notes

References

Citations

Bibliography

 
 
 
 
 
 
 
 
 
 
 
 
 
 
 
 
 
 
 
 
 
 

1922 births
1944 deaths
Luftwaffe pilots
German World War II flying aces
Luftwaffe personnel killed in World War II
Recipients of the Gold German Cross
Recipients of the Knight's Cross of the Iron Cross with Oak Leaves
People from Vorpommern-Greifswald
Military personnel from Mecklenburg-Western Pomerania
Missing in action of World War II
Aerial disappearances of military personnel in action